The Baden-Württemberg-Trophy is a Group 3 flat horse race in Germany open to thoroughbreds aged three years or older. It is run at Baden-Baden over a distance of 2,400 metres (about 1½ miles), and it is scheduled to take place each year in October.

The event is named after Baden-Württemberg, the state in which the racecourse is located. It was established in 2004, and was originally contested over 2,200 metres. It was extended to 2,400 metres in 2011.

The race was titled the Hubertus-Liebrecht-Gedächtnispreis in 2012.

Records
Most successful horse:
 no horse has won this race more than once

Leading jockey:
 no jockey has won this race more than once

Leading trainer (2 wins):
 Peter Schiergen – Saldentigerin (2005), Silvaner (2011)
 Andreas Wöhler – Simonas (2006), Seismos (2012)

Winners

See also
 List of German flat horse races

References
 Racing Post:
 galopp-sieger.de – Baden-Württemberg-Trophy.
 horseracingintfed.com – International Federation of Horseracing Authorities – Race Detail (2012).
 pedigreequery.com – Baden-Württemberg-Trophy – Baden-Baden.

Open middle distance horse races
Horse races in Germany
Recurring sporting events established in 2004
Sport in Baden-Württemberg